David Hood (born September 21, 1943) is an American bassist from Muscle Shoals, Alabama. He also plays the trombone. He is a member of the Alabama Music Hall of Fame.

Early life and education 
Hood was born in Sheffield, Alabama and attended the University of North Alabama.

Career 
Hood started his career playing with the Mystics and as a backup musician at FAME Studios. He went on to co-found Muscle Shoals Sound Studio, where he produced songs for Willie Nelson, Cher and others. He played bass on albums by Boz Scaggs, Joe Cocker, Albert King, Aretha Franklin, Cat Stevens, Peabo Bryson, Wendy Waldman, Julian Lennon, Paul Simon, Lulu, Shirley Brown, Glenn Frey, Patti Austin, Joan Baez, Tony Joe White, Linda Ronstadt, Paul Anka, Rod Stewart, Solomon Burke, J. J. Cale, Art Garfunkel, Bob Seger, Shelby Lynne, Bugs Bunny, Leon Russell, William Bell, Traffic, the Staple Singers, Frank Black, Odetta, John Hiatt, Etta James, John Altenburgh, Johnny & The MoTones and Percy Sledge. Hood appeared in 2009 on Klaus Voormann's solo album A Sideman's Journey. He participated in the Waterboys album, Modern Blues, recorded mainly in Nashville, and is currently on tour with them.

Personal life 
Hood is married to Judy Sockwell Hood.

Hood's son, Patterson Hood, is the frontman and one of two (formerly three) songwriters for Drive-By Truckers.

Collaborations 

With Traffic
 Shoot Out at the Fantasy Factory (Island Records, 1973)

With Julian Lennon
 Valotte (Atlantic Records, 1984)

With Solomon Burke
 Proud Mary (Ola, 1969)

With Dee Dee Bridgewater
 Dee Dee Bridgewater (Atlantic Records, 1976)

With Mink DeVille
 Sportin' Life (Polydor Records, 1985)

With Shelby Lynne
 Tears, Lies and Alibis (Everso, 2010)

With Billy Burnette
 Gimme You (Columbia Records, 1980)

With Jim Lauderdale
 Black Roses (Sky Crunch Records, 2013)
 London Southern (Proper Records, 2017)

With José Feliciano 
 Sweet Soul Music (Private Stock Records, 1976)

With Art Garfunkel
 Breakaway (Columbia Records, 1975)
 Watermark (Columbia Records, 1977)

With Wendy Waldman
 Gypsy Symphony (Warner Bros. Records, 1974)

With J. J. Cale
 Really (A&M Records, 1972)

With Shirley Brown
 Joy & Pain (Malaco Records, 1993)
 Unleashed (Malaco Records, 2009)

With Margie Joseph
 Margie Joseph Make a New Impression (Volt Records, 1971)

With Willy DeVille
 Horse of a Different Color (EastWest Records, 1999)

With Kim Carnes
 Sailin' (A&M Records, 1976)

With Odetta
 Odetta Sings (Polydor Records, 1970)

With Clarence Carter
 This is Clarence Carter (Atlantic Records, 1968)
 Testifyin (Atlantic Records, 1969)

With Bonnie Bramlett
 Lady's Choice (Capricorn Records, 1976)
 Beautiful (Rockin' Camel, 2008)

With Dan Penn
 Nobody's Fool (Bell Records, 1973)
 Do Right Man (Sire Records, 1994)
 Something About the Night (Dandy Records, 2016)

With Calvin Russell
 Calvin Russell (Last Call Records, 1997)
 Sam (Last Call Records, 1999)

With Bettye LaVette
 The Scene of the Crime (ANTI-, 2007)

With Willie Nelson
 Phases and Stages (Atlantic Records, 1974)

With Frank Black
 Honeycomb (Cooking Vinyl, 2005)
 Fast Man Raider Man (Cooking Vinyl, 2006)

With Boz Scaggs
 Boz Scaggs (Atlantic Records, 1969)
 My Time (Columbia Records, 1972)

With Johnny Rivers
 The Road (Atlantic Records, 1974)
 Borrowed Time (RSO Records, 1980)

With Bobby Bland
 Midnight Run (Malaco Records, 1989)
 Portrait of the Blues (Malaco Records, 1991)
 Sad Street (Malaco Records, 1995)
 Memphis Monday Morning (Malaco Records, 1998)
 Blues at Midnight (Malaco Records, 2003)

With John Paul White
 Beulah (Single Lock Records, 2016)
 The Hurting Kind (Single Lock Records, 2019)

With Steve Cropper
 Night After Night (MCA Records, 1982)
 Dedicated – A Salute to the 5 Royales (429 Records, 2011)

With Mary MacGregor
 Torn Between Two Lovers (Ariola Records, 1976)

With Frankie Miller
 Standing on the Edge (Capitol Records, 1982)

With Kate Campbell
 Monuments (Evangeline Records, 2003)
 1000 Pound Machine (Large River Music, 2012)

With Delbert McClinton
 Second Wind (Capricorn Records, 1978)
 The Jealous Kind (Capitol Records, 1980)
 Plain from the Heart (Capitol Records, 1981)

With Jimmy Cliff
 Another Cycle (Island Records, 1971)

With Levon Helm
 Levon Helm (ABC Records, 1978)
 Levon Helm (Capitol Records, 1982)

With Lonnie Mack
 The Hills of Indiana (Elektra Records, 1971)

With Barry Goldberg
 Two Jews Blues (Buddah Records, 1969)
 Barry Goldberg (Atco Records, 1974)

With Mavis Staples
 Mavis Staples (Volt Records, 1969)
 Only for the Lonely (Volt Records, 1970)
 Oh What a Feeling (Warner Bros. Records, 1979)

With Cat Stevens
 Izitso (A&M Records, 1977)

With Frank Black and Reid Paley
 Paley & Francis (Cooking Vinyl, 2011)

With Nicole Atkins
 Italian Ice (Single Lock Records, 2020)

With Jimmy Buffett
 Beach House on the Moon (Island Records, 1999)

With Leslie West
 Soundcheck (Provogue Records, 2015)

With Beth Nielsen Chapman
 Hearing It First (Capitol Records, 1980)

With A. J. Croce
 Just Like Medicine (Compass Records, 2017)

With Etta James
 Tell Mama (Cadet Records, 1968)
 The Right Time (Elektra Records, 1992)

With Albert King
 Lovejoy (Stax Records, 1971)

With Paul Simon
 There Goes Rhymin' Simon (Columbia Records, 1973)
 Still Crazy After All These Years (Columbia Records, 1975)

With Aretha Franklin
 This Girl's in Love with You (Atlantic Records, 1970)
 Spirit in the Dark (Atlantic Records, 1970)

With Gail Davies
 The Game (Warner Bros. Records, 1980)

With Eddie Rabbitt
 Loveline (Elektra Records, 1979)

With Candi Staton
 Candi (Warner Bros. Records, 1974)
 Life Happens (Beracah Records, 2014)

With Dianne Brooks
 Back Stairs in My Life (Reprise Records, 1976)

With Lulu
 New Routes (Atlantic Records, 1970)

With Bob Seger
 Smokin' O.P.'s (Reprise Records, 1972)
 Back in '72 (Reprise Records, 1973)
 Beautiful Loser (Capitol Records, 1975)
 Night Moves (Capitol Records, 1976)
 Stranger in Town (Capitol Records, 1978)
 Against the Wind (Capitol Records, 1980)
 The Distance (Capitol Records, 1982)

With Rod Stewart
 Atlantic Crossing (Warner Bros. Records, 1975)
 A Night on the Town (Warner Bros. Records, 1976)

With Jason Isbell
 Sirens of the Ditch (New West Records, 2007)

With Glenn Frey
 No Fun Aloud (Asylum Records, 1982)
 The Allnighter (MCA Records, 1984)
 Soul Searchin' (MCA Records, 1988)

With Ronnie Hawkins
 Ronnie Hawkins (Cotillion Records, 1970)

With Linda Ronstadt
 Linda Ronstadt (Capitol Records, 1971)

With Joan Baez
 Honest Lullaby (Portrait Records, 1979)

With Paul Anka
 Feelings (United Artists Records, 1975)

With John P. Hammond
 Southern Fried (Atlantic Records, 1971)

With Wilson Pickett
 Hey Jude (Atlantic Records, 1969)
 Right On (Atlantic Records, 1970)
 Don't Knock My Love (Atlantic Records, 1971)

With Lindi Ortega
 Faded Gloryville (Last Gang Records, 2015)

With Eddie Floyd
 Soul Street (Stax Records, 1974)

With Sheryl Crow
 Threads (Big Machine Records, 2019)

With William Bell
 Wow... (Stax Records, 1971)
 Phases of Reality (Stax Records, 1972)

With Patti Austin
 Body Language (CTI Records, 1980)
 In My Life (CTI Records, 1983)

With Tony Joe White
 The Train I'm On (Warner Brothers, 1972)
 Closer to the Truth (Festival Records, 1991)

With Cher
 3614 Jackson Highway (Atco Records, 1969)

With Joe Cocker
 Luxury You Can Afford (Asylum Records, 1978)

With Laura Nyro
 Christmas and the Beads of Sweat (Columbia Records, 1970)

With Helen Reddy
 Take What You Find (Capitol Records, 1980)

With Peabo Bryson
 Peabo (Bullet Records, 1976)

With Billy Ray Cyrus
 The SnakeDoctor Circus (BBR, 2019)

With Leon Russell
 Leon Russell and the Shelter People (Shelter Records, 1971)

With Toulouse
 Toulouse (Magique, 1976)

References

External links 

 David Hood at NAMM Oral History Program

1943 births
American rock bass guitarists
American male bass guitarists
Living people
Muscle Shoals Rhythm Section members
Traffic (band) members
University of North Alabama alumni
People from Sheffield, Alabama
American rhythm and blues bass guitarists
American session musicians
Guitarists from Alabama
The Rockets (band) members
20th-century American guitarists